Pride Air was a United States airline that operated for three months during 1985. Pride Air was based out of New Orleans International Airport (MSY).

History

Pride Air was managed by several people who participated in an unsuccessful attempt to acquire Continental Airlines. Many of the investors were former Continental pilots who left the airline after Continental's first bankruptcy. They chose New Orleans (MSY) as a hub because there was no one dominant airline operating from the airport at that time. Pride Air management had previously considered Kansas City as possible hub but then reconsidered when Eastern Airlines began building up their service at Kansas City.

Operations began on August 1, 1985.  Pride Air did not initially offer service as a low-cost carrier and was instead structured more as a full service airline.  However, due to increased competition from Continental Airlines in the New Orleans market in tandem with low initial passenger loads, Pride Air suspended operations on November 15, 1985, only three months after it began flying.  The business plan for the airline centered on a hub operation in New Orleans which would link cities in California and Florida with Denver, Las Vegas and Salt Lake City also being served.  Northeastern International Airways had previously tried this approach in New Orleans in 1984.

Paul Eckel was the chairman and chief executive of Pride Air.

Fleet
 6 Boeing 727-200 
 3 Boeing 727-100

Destinations

New Orleans - Hub (MSY)
Denver (DEN)
Ft. Lauderdale (FLL)
Jacksonville (JAX)
Las Vegas (LAS)
Los Angeles (LAX)
Miami (MIA)
Orlando (MCO)
Sacramento (SMF)
Salt Lake City (SLC)
San Diego (SAN)
San Francisco (SFO)
San Jose (SJC)
Sarasota (SRQ)
Tampa (TPA)
West Palm Beach (PBI)

See also 
 List of defunct airlines of the United States

References

External links
  (click on Pride Air for timetable and route map.)
 

Defunct airlines of the United States
Airlines established in 1985
Airlines disestablished in 1985
Defunct companies based in Louisiana
Companies based in New Orleans
Transportation in Jefferson Parish, Louisiana
1985 establishments in Louisiana